Simon Nicholas Knight Ardizzone is an editor and filmmaker. He produced and co-directed the documentary Hacking Democracy with Russell Michaels (2006) and co-directed Kill Chain: The Cyber War on America's Elections (2020) with Russell Michaels and Sarah Teale. He was an editor on the TV documentaries: God Is Green (2007); Britain's Greatest Monarch (2005); and What Made Mozart Tic (2004).

Ardizzone studied at Durham University. He later graduated from the National Film and Television School in 1995.

References

External links 
 
 

Year of birth missing (living people)
Living people
American documentary film directors
American documentary film producers
Alumni of University College, Durham
Alumni of the National Film and Television School